The third Revilla government was a regional government of Cantabria led by President Miguel Ángel Revilla. It was formed in July 2015 after the regional election and ended in July 2019 following the regional election.

Government

References

2015 establishments in Cantabria
2019 disestablishments in Cantabria
Cabinets established in 2015
Cabinets disestablished in 2019
Cabinets of Cantabria